Father Takes a Wife is a 1941 American comedy film starring Gloria Swanson and Adolphe Menjou. Silent screen queen Gloria Swanson returned to films after a seven-year absence. Eight years later, Swanson staged another comeback in the classic Sunset Boulevard (1950).

Plot

Senior (Adolphe Menjou) is a middle-aged widowed shipping magnate, who falls in love with celebrated actress Leslie Collier (Gloria Swanson) and marries her after a whirlwind courtship.

Cast
 Adolphe Menjou as Fredrick Osborne Sr.
 Gloria Swanson as Leslie Collier
 John Howard  as Fredrick Osborne Jr.
 Desi Arnaz as Carlos Bardez
 Helen Broderick as Aunt Julie
 Florence Rice as Enid Osborne
 Neil Hamilton as Vincent Stewart
 Grady Sutton as Tailor
 George Meader as Henderson 
 Mary Treen as Secretary
 Ruth Dietrich as Miss Patterson
 Jack Briggs as Joe, Senior's Driver (uncredited)

Reception
The film lost $104,000 at the box office.

References

External list
 Father Takes a Wife at IMDb
 
 
 

1941 films
1941 comedy films
American comedy films
American black-and-white films
RKO Pictures films
Films directed by Jack Hively
1940s English-language films
1940s American films